BC Card Cup may refer to:

 BC Card Cup (Korea's national championship), Go competition in South Korea
 BC Card Cup World Baduk Championship, international Go competition